Charlotte Elise Best (born 16 January 1994) is an Australian actress and model. She is best known for her role in the show Home and Away as the young girl in the Campbell family, Annie Campbell.

Biography
Best grew up in the suburb of Point Frederick in the city of Gosford in New South Wales. Along with her three brothers. Best attended Central Coast Grammar School where she won a performance award at the age of eight. From there she moved with her family to Beauty Point, attending SCECGS Redlands for six months until enrolling at Brent Street Performing Arts High School.

Best made her television debut in 2007 in Home and Away, starring as Annie Campbell until 2010. She continued her education on-set, eventually completing her HSC in 2011 at Oxford Falls Grammar School. Three months into a full-time Global Studies course at the University of Technology, Sydney, Best accepted the role of Cheryl Haynes in Puberty Blues.

From a young age, Best has appeared regularly as a fashion model in such magazines as Barbie, Total Girl, Oyster and Cosmopolitan. She was the face of Miss Metallicus Clothing brand and appeared on Comedy Inc, and has modelled for Supre.

She has been an ambassador for the charities Cure Our Kids and World Vision.

Career
Her most notable role was as Annie Campbell in the long running TV series Home and Away between 2007 and 2010. Her character went on a student exchange to Japan, commencing October 2009, which was originally scheduled to be for 6 months. She returned on screen in March 2010, on a 6-week holiday break from Japan, before leaving again. Best earned a nomination for Most Popular New Female Talent at the Logie Awards of 2008, which was won by Bindi Irwin.

In March 2012, it was announced that Best had been cast as Cheryl Hayes in Network Ten's drama series Puberty Blues, which is based on the 1979 novel of the same name by Gabrielle Carey and Kathy Lette.

In 2018 she starred in the Australian web television series Tidelands as Cal McTeer, the lead role. It was released on 14 December 2018 on Netflix. She has also starred as Aria Wolf in the film Ascendant, released on 8 April 2021.

Filmography

References

External links
 

1994 births
Living people
Actresses from Sydney
Australian child actresses
Australian female models
Australian television actresses
People educated at Redlands, Cremorne